Osceola County is a county in the U.S. state of Michigan. As of the 2020 United States Census, the population was 22,891. The county seat is Reed City.

History

When established by the Michigan Legislature on April 1, 1840, it was named Unwattin County, after Chief Unwattin of the local Ottawa people. As a representative of the Ottawa nation, he participated in negotiations for the Treaty of Washington (1836) that granted a vast expanse of Michigan to the US Federal Government. The name was changed March 8, 1843, to Osceola, after the Seminole chief who achieved renown in Florida.

The county was initially attached for administrative purposes to Ottawa County. In 1855, it was attached to Mason County; in 1857, to Newaygo County; and in 1859, to Mecosta County.

As the population increased, separate county government was organized in 1869, with Hersey designated as the county seat. Reed City became the official county seat in 1927. The county was developed initially for harvesting and processing lumber, and many European Americans came to work in lumbering and the mills.

Geography
The low rolling hills of Osceola County were completely wooded prior to settlement; at present about half of the area has been cleared and converted to agricultural or urban use. There are numerous small lakes and ponds scattered across the county; the largest is Rose Lake, northeast of LeRoy. The highest point on the terrain ( ASL) is Grove Hill, in Sherman Township. The county is drained by the Muskegon River and branches of the Manistee River. Osceola County is part of Northern Michigan.

Adjacent counties

 Wexford County − northwest
 Missaukee County − northeast
 Clare County − east
 Isabella County − southeast
 Mecosta County − south
 Newaygo County − southwest
 Lake County − west

Major highways

 
 
  in Reed City

Demographics

2000 census
At the 2000 United States Census, there were 23,197 people, 8,861 households and 6,415 families in the county. The population density was 41 per square mile (16/km2). There were 12,853 housing units at an average density of 23 per square mile (9/km2). The racial makeup of the county was 97.51% White, 0.35% Black or African American, 0.50% Native American, 0.22% Asian, 0.02% Pacific Islander, 0.20% from other races, and 1.21% from two or more races. 0.99% of the population were Hispanic or Latino of any race. 26.0% were of German, 11.9% English, 11.0% American, 8.8% Irish, 6.5% Dutch and 5.2% Polish ancestry. 96.8% spoke English, 1.1% German and 1.0% Spanish as their first language.

There were 8,861 households, of which 32.90% had children under the age of 18 living with them, 58.10% were married couples living together, 9.70% had a female householder with no husband present, and 27.60% were non-families. 22.60% of all households were made up of individuals, and 9.80% had someone living alone who was 65 years of age or older. The average household size was 2.58 and the average family size was 3.01.

27.10% of the population were under the age of 18, 8.00% from 18 to 24, 26.50% from 25 to 44, 24.20% from 45 to 64, and 14.20% who were 65 years of age or older. The median age was 38 years. For every 100 females there were 97.70 males. For every 100 females age 18 and over, there were 94.70 males.

The median household income was $34,102 and the median family income was $39,205. Males had a median income of $29,837 compared with $22,278 for females. The per capita income for the county was $15,632. About 9.50% of families and 12.70% of the population were below the poverty line, including 15.90% of those under age 18 and 10.30% of those age 65 or over.

Government

The county government operates the jail, maintains rural roads, operates the major local courts, keeps files of deeds and mortgages, maintains vital records, administers public health regulations, and participates with the state in the provision of welfare and other social services. The county board of commissioners controls the budget but has only limited authority to make laws or ordinances. In Michigan, most local government functions — police and fire, building and zoning, tax assessment, street maintenance, etc. — are the responsibility of individual cities and townships.

Communities

Cities
 Evart
 Reed City (county seat)

Villages
 Hersey
 LeRoy
 Marion
 Tustin

Unincorporated communities

 Ashton
 Dighton
 Highland
 Ina
 Orono
 Park Lake
 Pisgah Heights
 Sears

Townships

 Burdell Township
 Cedar Township
 Evart Township
 Hartwick Township
 Hersey Township
 Highland Township
 Le Roy Township
 Lincoln Township
 Marion Township
 Middle Branch Township
 Orient Township
 Osceola Township
 Richmond Township
 Rose Lake Township
 Sherman Township
 Sylvan Township

See also
 List of Michigan State Historic Sites in Osceola County, Michigan
 National Register of Historic Places listings in Osceola County, Michigan

References

External links
 
 

 
Michigan counties
1869 establishments in Michigan
Populated places established in 1869